Leonardo Carneiro Monteiro Picciani (born 6 November 1979 in Nilópolis) is a Brazilian lawyer and politician affiliated to the Brazilian Democratic Movement (MDB), and former minister of Sports appoint by president Michel Temer. Is son of the suspended state deputy and former president of the Legislative Assembly of Rio de Janeiro, Jorge Picciani.

References

1979 births
Living people
Brazilian Democratic Movement politicians
People from Nilópolis
Agriculturalists
21st-century Brazilian lawyers
Sports ministers of Brazil